The coat of arms of the La Guajira was officially adopted by the Departmental Assembly Ordinance 028 of November 29, 1966 after the winning design of a public contest of pseudonymous contestant "Angel Cuervo". The coat of arms has subsequently been modified two occasions by the Ordinance 052 of 1994 and Ordinance 009 of March 10, 1998.

Design
The coat of arms of the Department of La Guajira is quarterly divided by four quarters sections of unequal proportions bordered by silver white pearls.

See also
Flag of the Department of La Guajira

References
 

Symbols of La Guajira Department
La Guajira
La Guajira
La Guajira
La Guajira
La Guajira
La Guajira
La Guajira